Elizabeth Mortimer, Lady Percy and Baroness Camoys (12 February 1371 – 20 April 1417), was a medieval English noblewoman, the granddaughter of Lionel of Antwerp, 1st Duke of Clarence, and great-granddaughter of King Edward III. Her first husband was Sir Henry Percy, known to history as 'Hotspur'. She married secondly Thomas Camoys, 1st Baron Camoys. She is represented as 'Kate, Lady Percy,' in Shakespeare's Henry IV, Part 1, and briefly again as 'Widow Percy' in Henry IV, Part 2.

Family, marriages, and issue 
Elizabeth Mortimer was born at Usk, Monmouthshire, Wales, on 12 or 13 February 1371, the eldest daughter of Edmund Mortimer, 3rd Earl of March, and his wife, Philippa, the only child of Lionel, 1st Duke of Clarence, and Elizabeth de Burgh, Countess of Ulster. Elizabeth Mortimer had two brothers, Sir Roger (1374–1398) and Sir Edmund (1376–1409), and a younger sister, Philippa (1375–1401), who married firstly John Hastings, 3rd Earl of Pembroke (d.1389), secondly Richard de Arundel, 11th Earl of Arundel (1346–1397), and thirdly, Sir Thomas Poynings.

It is unknown when Elizabeth was married to her first husband, Henry Percy, nicknamed 'Hotspur' (1364–1403), eldest son of Henry Percy, 1st Earl of Northumberland, who was already acquiring a reputation as a great soldier and warrior and responsible administrator in the early 1390s, when they were first together.  They had two children:

Henry Percy, 2nd Earl of Northumberland (3 February 1393 – 22 May 1455), who married Eleanor Neville, by whom he had issue. He was slain at the First Battle of St Albans. 
Lady Elizabeth Percy (c.1395-26 October 1436), who married firstly John Clifford, 7th Baron de Clifford, slain at the Siege of Meaux on 13 March 1422, by whom she had issue, and secondly Ralph Neville, 2nd Earl of Westmorland (d. 3 November 1484), by whom she had a son, Sir John Neville.

On 21 July 1403, Elizabeth's husband was slain at the Battle of Shrewsbury while commanding a rebel army that fought against the superior forces of King Henry IV. He was buried in Whitchurch, Shropshire; however, when rumours circulated that he was still alive, 'Henry IV had the corpse exhumed and displayed it, propped upright between two millstones, in the market place at Shrewsbury'. This done, the king dispatched Percy's head to York, where it was impaled on one of the city's gates; his four-quarters were first sent to London, Newcastle upon Tyne, Bristol, and Chester before they were finally delivered to Elizabeth. She had him buried in York Minster in November of that year. In January 1404, Percy was posthumously declared a traitor and his lands were forfeited to the Crown. The king ordered Elizabeth herself arrested on 8 October 1403.

Sometime after 3 June 1406, Elizabeth Mortimer was married to her second husband, Thomas de Camoys, 1st Baron Camoys. Although Camoys was in his mid-sixties, she may have had a son by him, Sir Roger Camoys. Like her first husband, Camoys was a renowned soldier who commanded the left wing of the English army at the Battle of Agincourt on 25 October 1415.

Death 
Elizabeth died on 20 April 1417 at the age of 46 years. She was buried in St. George's Church at Trotton, Sussex. Her second husband was buried beside her. Their table-tomb with its fine monumental brass depicting the couple slightly less than life size and holding hands can be viewed in the middle of the chancel inside the church.

King Henry VIII's Queen consort Jane Seymour was one of Elizabeth Mortimer's many descendants through her daughter Elizabeth Percy.

In fiction 
Lady Elizabeth is represented as Kate, Lady Percy, in William Shakespeare's plays Henry IV, Part 1 and Henry IV, Part 2. She is also the main character in Anne O’Brien’s novel Queen of the North published in 2018.

Ancestry

Notes

References

External links
Cawley, Charles.  "ENGLAND, EARLS CREATED 1207-1466", fmg.ac. Accessed 7 January 2023. 

1371 births
1417 deaths
Daughters of British earls
People from Usk
Elizabeth
14th-century English women
14th-century English people
15th-century English women
15th-century English people
Wives of knights
Camoys
People from Trotton